José Joaquín Puig de la Bellacasa y Urdampilleta (5 June 1931 – 20 April 2021) was a Spanish diplomat and civil servant.

Early life and education 
Bellacasa attended the Complutense University of Madrid.

Career 
He served as the Undersecretary of Foreign Affairs from 1978 to 1980. Between 1980 and 1983, he was the Spanish Ambassador to the Holy See and the Sovereign Military Order of Malta, from 1983 and 1990 to the United Kingdom and from 1991 to 1995 to Portugal.

He was named Secretary-General of the Spanish Royal Household, office he held until 1991.

Death
He died from COVID-19 on 20 April 2021, at the age of 89.

References 

1931 births
2021 deaths
People from Bilbao
Spanish diplomats
Spanish jurists
Complutense University of Madrid alumni
Ambassadors of Spain to the Holy See
Ambassadors of Spain to the United Kingdom
Ambassadors of Spain to Portugal
Spanish transition to democracy
Knights of Calatrava
Knights Grand Cross of the Order of Isabella the Catholic
Knights Grand Cross of the Royal Victorian Order
Deaths from the COVID-19 pandemic in Spain